Dow Henry Drukker (February 7, 1872 – January 11, 1963) was an American Republican Party politician from New Jersey who represented the state's 7th congressional district from 1914 to 1919.

Biography
He was born in Sneek, Netherlands, and immigrated to the United States with his parents, who settled in Grand Rapids, Michigan the same year. He attended the public schools of Grand Rapids and then moved to New Jersey in 1897 and settled in Passaic, New Jersey. He worked as a businessman and banker and served as a member of the Passaic County Board of Chosen Freeholders from 1906–1913, serving as director 1908-1912.

Drukker was elected as a Republican to the Sixty-third Congress to fill the vacancy caused by the death of Robert Gunn Bremner. He was reelected to the Sixty-fourth and Sixty-fifth Congresses and served from April 7, 1914, to March 3, 1919. He was not a candidate for renomination in 1918. After leaving Congress, he was the publisher of the Herald-News of Passaic-Clifton 1916-1963 and became president of the Union Building and Investment Co., in 1909. He was knighted as an Officer of the Order of Orange-Nassau by Queen Juliana for services rendered in the great flood of 1953. He resided in Clifton, New Jersey and Lake Wales, Florida until his death in Lake Wales in 1963. He was buried in Cedar Lawn Cemetery in Paterson, New Jersey.

References

Dow H. Drukker election in the New York Times

External links

 

1872 births
1963 deaths
County commissioners in New Jersey
Dutch emigrants to the United States
Politicians from Passaic, New Jersey
People from Sneek
Politicians from Clifton, New Jersey
Republican Party members of the United States House of Representatives from New Jersey
Burials at Cedar Lawn Cemetery